Cheshire is an unincorporated community in Delaware County, in the U.S. state of Ohio.

History
The first store opened at Cheshire in 1847. The town site was platted in 1849. The post office at Cheshire was called Constantia. This post office was established in 1851, and remained in operation until 1904.

References

Unincorporated communities in Delaware County, Ohio
Unincorporated communities in Ohio